Waltham Chase is a village in Hampshire, England, neighbouring the town of Bishop's Waltham. It is in the civil parish of Shedfield.
The village comprises about 2 sq. kilometres of land to the south-east of Bishop's Waltham.

History
Previously a forest used for the hierarchy of Bishop's Waltham to hunt game, the village started to establish its own, independent identity in the 19th Century.

Amenities
The village has a primary school - St John the Baptist CoE; older children attend Swanmore College nearby. It has several green areas, e.g. a recreation ground and park area. It has a thriving village hall which is used by many societies and clubs. There is a bicycle shop, a village store which includes the post office and there is also a hairdresser. There is a garage with car repair, a car sales outlet and a commercial vehicle sales business.
 
It has a Methodist church; the local Anglican church, St John the Baptist, is located at Shedfield. The parish of Shedfield includes Shirrell Heath, Waltham Chase and Shedfield.

The village has one inn, The Black Dog.

There are stables, several farms and a number of small businesses in the village, including Robin Appel Ltd, an independent grain merchant, What The Pup and The Dog Room in Sandy Lane, the local dog groomers.

Demographics
According to the ONS (from the 2011 census) the population of the whole Winchester LSOA (Lower Layer Super Output Areas) - "Winchester 012F" area which includes both Waltham Chase and most of Shirrell Heath was 1,481, with 579 households.

Places of interest
There is an SSSI site (unit ID 1007744) within the village, Waltham Chase Meadows - "one of the best examples in the county of dry neutral unimproved pasture."

Across the road from the Moors Nature Reserve is the Chase Mill, which was still in use in 1957. This mill has been featured on a television restoration programme - Salvage Squad - which first aired on Channel 4 in January 2003.

References

External links

 St John the Baptist Primary School - Local primary school for Waltham Chase.
  St John the Baptist Church - the parish church.
  Waltham Chase Methodist Church
  Shedfield Parish Council
  Waltham Chase Village Website

Villages in Hampshire